Persoonia adenantha is a plant in the family Proteaceae and is endemic to eastern Australia. It is an upright shrub or small tree with smooth, elliptic to lance-shaped leaves and groups of hairy yellow flowers. It has sometimes been confused with P. cornifolia and P. stradbrokensis.

Description
The leaves are flat, narrow elliptic to lance-shaped with the edges turned down. The flowers are yellow and arranged in groups, each flower with an erect, hairy pedicel . The tepals have a distinct, pointed tip on the end. The central style is surrounded by four yellow anthers which are also joined at the base with the tips rolled back, so that it resembles a cross when viewed end-on. Flowering occurs from November to April and is followed by fruit which are green drupes.

This persoonia has been known as Persoonia cornifolia subsp. B and sometimes intergrades with P. stradbrokensis near Casino.

Taxonomy and naming
Persoonia adenantha was first formally described by Czech botanist Karel Domin in 1921 from a specimen collected in forest near the Logan River. The description was published in the journal Bibliotheca Botanica. The specific epithet (adenantha) means "gland-flowered".

Distribution and habitat
This persoonia grows in heath, forest and rainforest between Pimpama and Tamborine Mountain in south-east Queensland and south to Evans Head in New South Wales.

Cultivation
Persoonia adenantha has horticultural potential as a formal or informal hedging plant. Plants require good drainage to grow well in gardens.

References

adenantha
Flora of New South Wales
Flora of Queensland
Plants described in 1921